Eli Nissan is an Israeli DJ, producer and musician based in Tel Aviv.  Born in Netanya, Nissan was a guitarist and singer/songwriter for Israeli band Portrait before shifting to electronic music.

Discography

Albums
Casablanca EP [Lost Miracle Label]
CASABLANCA /
LYLA
(June 25, 2021)
The Last Poem, Lost & Found, 2019

Singles & EPs
"Karnaval", Lost & Found, 2020
"Liquid Stars" (EP), Lost & Found, 2017

References

Electronic dance music DJs
Israeli DJs
Progressive house musicians
Remixers